Lynes may refer to:

People
 Barbara Buhler Lynes (early 21st c.), American art historian, curator and professor
 Barry Lynes (late 20th c.), author
 Colin Lynes (born 1977), British boxer
 Craig Lynes (born 1981), Scottish footballer
 Frank Lynes (1858–1913), American composer and music teacher
 George Platt Lynes (1907–1955), American fashion and commercial photographer
 Hubert Lynes (1874–1942), British admiral and amateur ornithologist
 John Lynes (1872–?), English cricketer
 Jeanette Lynes (early 21st c.), Canadian author, poet and professor
 Martin Lynes (born 1967), Australian actor
 Roy Lynes (born 1943), British musician 
 Russell Lynes (1910–1991), American art historian, photographer, author and editor
 Sandra Lynes (late 20th c.), Canadian alpine skier at the 1992 Winter Paralympics
 Tony Lynes (1929-2014), British writer and political lobbyist

Places
 W.F. Lynes Parkway, auxiliary Interstate Highway in and near Savannah, Georgia (United States)